Kumalo is a South African surname, sometimes an alternative spelling of Khumalo.

Notable people with the surname include:

Alf Kumalo (1930–2002), a South African photojournalist
Dumisani Kumalo (1947–2019), a South African diplomat
Basetsana Kumalo (born 1974), a South African television personality, beauty pageant titleholder, and businesswoman
Duma Kumalo (died 2006), a South African human rights activist
Bakithi Kumalo (born 1956), a South African musician

See also
Didier Kumalo, an Australian musical group